This was the first edition of the tournament.

Benjamin Bonzi won the title after Christopher O'Connell retired before the start of the third set in the final with the score at 6–7(10–12), 6–1.

Seeds

Draw

Finals

Top half

Bottom half

References

External links
Main draw
Qualifying draw

Saint-Tropez Open - 1